Nape was a town of ancient Lesbos.

The site of Nape is tentatively located near modern Klopedi.

Suda mention the Napaian Apollo (Ἀπόλλων Ναπαῖος).

References

Populated places in the ancient Aegean islands
Former populated places in Greece
Ancient Lesbos